F76 may refer to:
 BMW F 76, a tricycle delivery van
 Fallout 76, a video game
 , a frigate of the Royal Navy
 , a V-class destroyer of the Royal Navy